is a national park at the southwestern tip of the island of Shikoku, Japan. The park is spread over small areas on the western side of Shikoku between Ehime and Kōchi prefectures. The main feature of the park is Cape Ashizuri, the southernmost point of the island. The cape is noted for its extensive subtropical vegetation and its granite cliffs which offer views of the Pacific Ocean. Nakahama "John" Manjiro, the first Japanese to visit the United States, was born, shipwrecked, and was rescued in the vicinity of the park.

External links

  
 https://web.archive.org/web/20051123112036/http://www.biodic.go.jp/english/jpark/np/asizuri_e.html

References

National parks of Japan
Parks and gardens in Kōchi Prefecture
Parks and gardens in Ehime Prefecture
Protected areas established in 1972